Edward Lee Williams is a former professional American football player who played running back for four seasons for the Cincinnati Bengals and Tampa Bay Buccaneers.

References

1950 births
American football running backs
Cincinnati Bengals players
Tampa Bay Buccaneers players
Langston Lions football players
Living people